Treaty United Women's Football Club is an Irish association football club based in Limerick. The club was founded in 2020 in the place of Limerick W.F.C. following their financial collapse.  They play in the Women's National League, the top tier of women's association football in Ireland, and play their home matches at Markets Field, the same ground as their predecessors.

History 
Following the liquidation of Limerick F.C., the idea of a new team in Limerick arose. At first, it was to be called Limerick United but was forced to be changed due to threat of legal action from Limerick FC, because they had previously had that name. The idea of Treaty United came about because Limerick is also known as the Treaty County. Treaty United was confirmed as the name, and the women's team was ready to enter the 2020 Women's National League season and the men's the 2020 League of Ireland First Division, but the men's team pulled out of the 2020 season. The women's team, however, were ready for the season but had to wait until August because of the COVID-19 pandemic. They started their season on 8 August 2020 against reigning champions Peamount United, losing 5–0.

Players

Current squad

References

External links
 Senior women's squad on the Treaty United FC site
  Senior women's fixtures on the Treaty United FC site

 
Association football clubs established in 2020
Association football clubs in County Limerick
2020 establishments in Ireland
Women's association football clubs in the Republic of Ireland
Women's National League (Ireland) teams